is a Japanese comedian and chiropractor.

Filmography

Television
 Former appearances

 Programmes that appeared in acting, amateur

Internet

Films (movies)

Direct-to-video

Films

TV dramas

Magazines

Radio

Advertisements

Video games

Discography

Singles

Music videos

Video works

See also
List of Japanese actors

References

External links
 – Official Blog 

 – Yoshimoto Kogyo 

1979 births
Japanese impressionists (entertainers)
Japanese male comedians
People from Yokohama
Gay comedians
Japanese LGBT comedians
Living people